Cambridge Institute of Technology- North Campus is a private college of engineering and technology located in the northern part of the city of Bangalore. Established in 2013, CITNC offers three under-graduate courses and is affiliated to the Visvesvaraya Technological University (VTU). The institution is approved by AICTE, New Delhi and recognised by the Government of Karnataka.

History
Cambridge Institute of Technology - North Campus was founded in 2013 in the rural part of Bangalore city by Sharada Education trust which was established in 2009.  It was started by Rotarians Mukund Ananda M.P. and Dr. K. Udaya Kumar, with service to society as their motto. Dr. Udaya Kumar is serving as the Director of the college. He was earlier the Principal of B.N.M.Institute of Technology and Dr. Ambedkar Institute of Technology. Dr. Narayana B Dodda Pattar is the Principal of this college.

Undergraduate courses
CITNC offers Bachelor of Engineering (BE) at the Under Graduate level. The course spans over four years and is offered in three different branches. The course structure is based on the guidelines framed by VTU.

List of Under Graduate BE courses offered:

Computer Science & Engineering 
Electronics & Communication Engineering
Mechanical Engineering

External links
 

Engineering colleges in Bangalore
Educational institutions established in 2013
Affiliates of Visvesvaraya Technological University
2013 establishments in Karnataka